Mohamed Abdelkader  (born January 19, 1985 in Homs, Syria) is a Syrian footballer. He currently plays for Ala'ab Damanhour, which competes in the Egyptian Premier League, the top division in Egypt.

References

External links 
 Player profile at WDFC.Com

1985 births
Living people
Sportspeople from Homs
Syrian footballers
Association football forwards
Syrian expatriate footballers
Expatriate footballers in Egypt
Syrian expatriate sportspeople in Egypt
Al-Karamah players
Wadi Degla SC players
Syrian Premier League players